National Highway 751D, commonly referred to as NH 751D is a national highway in India. It is a secondary route of National Highway 51.  NH-751D runs in the state of Gujarat in India.

Route 
NH751D connects Vataman Chowk, Fatepura, Valandapura, Indranaj, Tarapur, Lakulesh Nagar and Dharmaj in the state of Gujarat.

Junctions  
 
  Terminal near Vataman.
  near Tarapur
  Terminal near Dharmaj.

See also 
 List of National Highways in India
 List of National Highways in India by state

References

External links 

 NH 751D on OpenStreetMap

National highways in India
National Highways in Gujarat